Zaqatala is a city in northwestern Azerbaijan and the administrative center of the Zagatala District. It has a municipal population of 31,300 inhabitants and is located on the Tala River. The municipality consists of the city of Zaqatala and the nearby village of Qazangül.

The city is populated mostly by Azerbaijanis, but with significant minorities of the indigenous Avar, Lezgin, Tsakhur and Ingiloy peoples.

History 
The territory of modern Zaqatala was once a province of Caucasian Albania. After that, the region was a separate kingdom within Georgian cultural and political influence.  During the medieval era what later became known as Saingilo was mostly controlled by the kingdom of Georgia and Shirvan.

In the Middle Ages seven Georgian schools operated in Saingilo which included the courses of theology, philosophy, orthography, church history, and the history of Georgia and for the students. These schools played an essential cultural and educational role. They put a vital contribution in establishing cultural relations among the peoples of the Caucasus.

Zaqatala has several sites of historic significance, most of which are centred on its 19th-century town centre.  The main square, formerly called Lenin Square, features a pair of 700-year-old plane trees.

The city's most prominent feature is a ruined fortress, built in the 1830s by occupying Russian forces during the Caucasian War to defend the city from rebels (See Djaro-Belokani league).  In the 1850s, the town was the site of battles between Russians and Dagestani leader Imam Shamil. It was center of Zakatal Okrug ("district") of the Tiflis Governorate between 1893 and 1905. It was part of the Transcaucasian Democratic Federative Republic briefly in 1918 before passing to the Azerbaijan Democratic Republic and later the Azerbaijan SSR.
In the 20th century the town and its fortress became more famous when the fortress was used as one of the prisons for the mutinous crew of the battleship Potëmkin, whose actions in the failed 1905 Revolution were a precursor to the eventual 1917 revolution.  The statue of one of the mutineers erected in the Soviet era still decorates Heydar Aliyev park not far from the fortress.  Currently, the fortress still houses a military garrison as well as several Soviet-style apartment buildings.  Near the northern part of the ramparts and off of the main square is a beautiful, but abandoned, church.   The town now sports a sizable new mosque.

Overview 
It is served by the A315 road coming from Mingachevir and leading to the Georgian border at Lagodekhi as well as by a small airfield.  North of the town there is an important wildlife and nature preserve. The Caucasus Mountains provide it with natural protection from the north winds. The wooded mountainsides, with frequent waterfalls, offer great hiking opportunities.  Due to its climate, the town became a mountain health resort.

Sports 

The city has 2 professional football teams, Simurg and Zagatala PFK. Zaqatala City Stadium located in Galaduzu area was inaugurated in 2008 within the Zagatala Olimpic Sports Complex. It has a capacity of 3,500 people.

Demographics 
Majority of the city and the district are ethnic Azerbaijanis with significant minorities of Avars, Lezgins, Tsakhurs and Ingiloys. The majority of population are  Sunni Muslim, with Orthodox Christians (mostly Ingiloys) minorities.

Transportation 

Zaqatala International Airport serves the city. The airport is connected by bus to the city center. There are domestic flights to Baku, however currently it is unavailable.

There are two bus stations in Zaqatala. One is in the centre, near the Farmer's Market. This bus station serves only the villages of Zaqatala. The second bus station is out of the centre, and this station serves the other cities and capital. Customers can buy the tickets directly at the bus station. Reaching this Bus station passengers can either take public transports or taxi. There is a railway station to Zaqatala and it connects Baku (the capital) to Zaqatala with a 12-hour ride.

Climate 
Zaqatala has a humid subtropical climate (Cfa) according to the Köppen climate classification.

Gallery

References

External links 

Populated places in Zaqatala District
Avar-speaking countries and territories